Kasa no Kanamura (笠 金村; dates unknown) was a Japanese waka poet of the Nara period.

Biography 
The date of Kasa no Kanamura's birth and death is unknown.

However he is said to have been active from fl.715-733.

Poetry 
Some 46 poems in the Man'yōshū are attributed to Kanamura: 230–232, 233–234, 364–365, 366–367, 368, 369, 543–545, 546–548, 907–909, 910–912, 920–922, 928–930, 935–937, 950–953, 1453–1455, 1532–1533, 1785–1786, and 1787–1789. Of these, sixteen—230, 231, 232, 233, 234, 368, 369, 950, 951, 952, 953, 1785, 1786, 1787, 1788, and 1789—are cited to the Kasa no Asomi Kanamura no Kashū (笠朝臣金村歌集). 233 and 234 are attributed to him by some manuscripts, but not others.

Susumu Nakanishi tentatively  takes his eulogy for Prince Shiki, composed in 715, as the beginning of his poetic career. He acted as a court poet to the imperial household.

References

Citations

Works cited 

 
 
 
 
 
 
 
 

Year of birth unknown
Year of death unknown
Man'yō poets
Japanese male poets